Collins St., 5 pm is a 1955 painting by Australian artist John Brack. The painting depicts office workers walking along busy Collins Street in Melbourne after finishing work for the day"Blank-faced office workers hurry by like sleep-walkers, thinking only of the pubs or their homes in the suburbs". 
Brack conceived the work after reading T. S. Eliot's 1922 poem The Waste Land.
It is considered a companion piece to Brack's earlier work The Bar.

The painting was purchased from Peter Bray Gallery for the National Gallery of Victoria's permanent Australian art collection and is exhibited in the Ian Potter Centre in Federation Square in Melbourne.

In 2011, Collins St., 5 pm was voted the most popular work in the collection of the National Gallery of Victoria.

References

External links
Collins St., 5pm - National Gallery of Victoria collection.

Paintings by John Brack
Paintings in the collection of the National Gallery of Victoria
1955 paintings
Arts in Melbourne